The 2004 Central Michigan Chippewas football team was an American football team that represented Central Michigan University in the Mid-American Conference (MAC) during the 2004 NCAA Division I-A football season. In their first season under head coach Brian Kelly, the Chippewas compiled a 4–7 record (3–5 against MAC opponents), finished in fifth place in the MAC's West Division, and were outscored by their opponents, 378 to 260. The team played its home games in Kelly/Shorts Stadium in Mount Pleasant, Michigan, with attendance of 75,216 in five home games.

The team's statistical leaders included Kent Smith with 2,284 passing yards, Jerry Seymour with 1,284 rushing yards, and Damien Linson with 574 receiving yards. Tailback Jerry Seymour was selected at the end of the 2004 season as the team's most valuable player.

Brian Kelly was introduced as Central Michigan's head football coach on January 2, 2004. He had served as the head football coach at Grand Valley State University for 13 years, compiling a 118-35-2 record and leading his Lakers football teams to NCAA Division II national championships in both 2002 and 2003.

NFL coaches Matt LaFleur and Robert Saleh were graduate assistants on this team.

Schedule

References

Central Michigan
Central Michigan Chippewas football seasons
Central Michigan Chippewas football